The following is a chronological list of English recording artist, Jessie J's concert tours.

Stand Up Tour

The Stand Up Tour is a UK tour by English recording artist Jessie J in support of her debut studio album, Who You Are.

Opening acts
 Encore

Setlist
 "Mamma Knows Best"
 "Abracadabra"  	
 "Stand Up"
 "Do It Like A Dude"
 "L.O.V.E"
 "Big White Room"
 "Who's Laughing Now"
 "Rainbow"
 "Nobody's Perfect"
Encore
 "Who You Are"
 "Price Tag"

Source:

The Band
 Guitar: Rene Woollard
 Drums: Nathaniel 'Tonez' Fuller
 Keyboards: Hannah V
 Bass: Phil Simmonds

Tour dates

Heartbeat Tour

Alive Tour

Sweet Talker Tour

Background 
In November 2014, Jessie J announced a 7-day UK Tour. The tour began in January, 2015. Around the end of 2014 Jessie J announced her 
first North American Tour. Throughout the course of the year she carried on promoting the 3rd Album in places, including Australia, Asia, North America and Europe with a total of 96 shows.

Setlist 
This is the setlist was obtained from the concert held on 20 January 2015, at the Rhyl Pavillon in Rhyl, Wales. It does not represent every concert for the duration of the tour.
"Ain't Been Done"
"Burnin Up"
"Wild"
"Who's Laughing Now"
"Loud"
"LaserLight"
"Nobody's Perfect"
"Sweet Talker"
"Seal Me With a Kiss"
"Abracadabra"
"Keep Us Together"
"Get Away"
"I Have Nothing"
"You Don't Really Know Me"
"Big White Room"
"Who You Are"
"Sexy Lady"
"Domino"
"Price Tag"
"Do It Like a Dude"
"Masterpiece"
"Bang Bang"

Tour dates

Live 2017

Live 2017 is the fifth concert tour by English singer-songwriter Jessie J. This intimate tour was to promote the singles from R.O.S.E, the album came out later. The tour began on 8 October 2017 in Birmingham, England, and is concluded on 1 November 2017, in New York, USA. The SINGER performed a total of 12 shows visiting Britain, Europe and North America.

Opening act
Albert Stanaj
Wayne Jackson

Setlist
Who You Are 
Domino
Real Deal
Nobody's Perfect 
Not My Ex 
Flashlight
Earth Song
Think About That 
Masterpiece
Mamma Knows Best 
Bang Bang 
Price Tag 
Do It Like A Dude

Tour dates

Notes

R.O.S.E Tour

The R.O.S.E Tour is the sixth concert tour by English singer-songwriter Jessie J, in support of her fourth studio album, R.O.S.E. (2018).

Opening act
Ro James 
J.Sheon 
Sincerely Wilson

Setlist
The following setlist was obtained from the concert held on 30 August 2018, at the Optics Valley International Tennis Centre in Wuhan, China. It does not represent all concerts for the duration of the tour.
"Think About That"
"Do It like a Dude"
"Burnin' Up"
"Petty"
"Nobody's Perfect"
"Not My Ex"
"Easy on Me"
"Thunder"
"Stand Up"
"Flashlight"
"Queen"
"Who You Are"
"Play"
"Domino"
"Masterpiece"
"Mamma Knows Best"
"Bang Bang"
"Price Tag"

Tour dates

Cancellations and rescheduled shows

Lasty Tour

Lasty Tour is the seventh concert tour by English singer-songwriter Jessie J.

Setlist
The following setlist was obtained from the concert held on 17 April 2019, at the Columbiahalle in Berlin, Germany. It does not represent all concerts for the duration of the tour.
"Who's Laughing Now"
"Masterpiece"
"Do It like a Dude"
"Real Deal"
"Not My Ex"
"Nobody's Perfect"
"It's My Party"
"Sexy Lady"
"Wild"
"Easy On Me"
"Big White Room"
"Stand Up"
"Queen"
"Flashlight"
"Bang Bang"
"Who You Are"
"Play"
"Domino"
"Price Tag"

Tour dates

References

Jessie J
Concert tours